Alak or ALAK may refer to:

Alak, Iran, a village in Kurdistan Province, Iran
Alak, Republic of Dagestan, a rural locality in Dagestan, Russia
Alak Dolak, a game similar to baseball that is played in Iran
Alak people, an Austro-Asiatic ethnic group of southern Laos
Alak language, a language spoken in southern Laos
Arrack (drink), or Alak, an alcoholic beverage
Alak, a fictional one-dimensional analogue of the Go board game from the novel The Planiverse

People with the surname
Julio Alak (born 1958), Argentine politician
Alak Jigme Thinley Lhundup Rinpoche (1939–2012), Tibetan Rinpoche and politician
ALAK PATIENCE